Cheadle Hulme South is an electoral ward in the Metropolitan Borough of Stockport. It elects three Councillors to Stockport Metropolitan Borough Council using the first past the post electoral method, electing one Councillor every year without election on the fourth.

It covers the southern part of Cheadle Hulme and contains Cheadle Hulme Station, as well the Cheadle Conservative and Liberal Democrat Constituency offices. The ward has Cheadle Hulme High School located on Woods Lane. Together with Bramhall North, Bramhall South, Cheadle and Gatley, Cheadle Hulme North, Heald Green and Stepping Hill Wards it makes up the Cheadle Parliamentary Constituency.

Councillors
Cheadle Hulme South electoral ward is represented in Westminster by Mary Robinson MP for Cheadle.

The ward is represented on Stockport Council by three councillors: Helen Foster-Grime (Lib Dem), Suzanne Wyatt (Lib Dem), and Mark Hunter (Lib Dem).

 indicates seat up for re-election.
 indicates councillor defected.

Elections in the 2020s

May 2021

Elections in the 2010s

May 2019

May 2018

May 2016

May 2015

May 2014

May 2012

May 2011

References

External links
Stockport Metropolitan Borough Council

Wards of the Metropolitan Borough of Stockport
Cheadle Hulme